Basiliskianos, also Basiliskos or Basilikinos, was a Byzantine courtier and companion of emperor Michael III.

Very little is known about his origin and early life. John Skylitzes and Theophanes Continuatus (as well as Zonaras, who follows them) report that he was originally a simple rower in one of the emperor's personal ships, but this may well be later fabrication to disparage him. Theophanes Constinuatus also reports that he was the brother of Constantine Kapnogenes, who later became Eparch of the City. 

On 1 September of that year, after a chariot race at the palace of Saint Mamas (in modern Beşiktaş), Basiliskianos congratulated the emperor so fulsomely on his victory that, according to the chroniclers, the delighted Michael ordered him to take from his own feet the red imperial boots and put them on himself. This provoked the displeasure of Michael's co-emperor Basil the Macedonian, a man of humble origin who had risen to power through his own close relationship with Michael. Michael, seeing Basil's disapproval, became angry, and threatened to make Basiliskianos co-emperor in Basil's place. 

The rift between Michael and his erstwhile protégé widened thereafter, and on 24 September 867, when Michael retired drunk to his quarters at Saint Mamas, Basil and eight of his supporters moved to kill the emperor. The  Rendakios, who normally slept before the emperor's bedroom, was absent, and Basiliskianos took his place on that night. When Basil and his co-conspirators barged into the bedchamber, Basiliskianos tried to oppose them but was wounded and thrown aside. After the conspirators killed Michael, they rowed down the Bosporus back to Constantinople, where Basil was hastily crowned sole emperor, inaugurating the Macedonian dynasty. Nothing further is known of Basiliskianos after that.

References

Sources 
 
 

9th-century Byzantine people
Patricii